Garth Brooks: Live in Kansas City was a series of concerts held by American country pop singer Garth Brooks from November 5 through November 14, 2007. Among the first concerts held at the newly opened Sprint Center in Kansas City, Missouri, the nine-show series were Brooks' first multi-concert performances since his 1996–98 world tour.

Background
In late 2007, Garth Brooks was slated to release The Ultimate Hits, a compilation and Brooks' first album featuring new music since 2001. The album release coincided with Sprint Center's opening, prompting Brooks' agreement to one promotional concert; however, ticket demand was extremely high, resulting in an additional eight concerts added. All concerts, consisting of nearly 160,000 tickets, sold out in less than two hours.

The final concert of the series, held on November 14, 2007, was simulcast live via National CineMedia on more than 300 movie theaters throughout the United States.

Set list
This set list is representative of the performance on November 14, 2007. It does not represent all concerts for the duration of the series.

"The Fever"
"Two of a Kind, Workin' on a Full House"
"Rodeo"
"Good Ride Cowboy"
"The Thunder Rolls"
"Shameless"
"We Shall Be Free" 
"Unanswered Prayers"
"The River"
"Papa Loved Mama"
"The Beaches of Cheyenne"
"Callin' Baton Rouge"
"More Than a Memory"
"Friends in Low Places"
"The Dance"
Encores
"Ain't Goin' Down ('Til the Sun Comes Up)"
"That Summer"
"Much Too Young (To Feel This Damn Old)"
"Two Pina Coladas"
"Unanswered Prayers"
"Fire and Rain" (James Taylor cover)
"Turn the Page" (Bob Seger cover)
"Unwound" (George Strait cover)
"The Fireman" (George Strait cover)
"Amarillo By Morning" (George Strait cover)
"Piano Man" (Billy Joel cover)
"American Pie" (Don McLean cover)

Tour dates

Personnel
 Robert Bailey – backing vocals
 Bruce Bouton – pedal steel guitar, lap steel guitar
 Garth Brooks – vocals, acoustic guitar
 Stephanie Davis – acoustic guitar, backing vocals
 David Gant – keyboards
 Mark Greenwood – bass guitar, backing vocals
 Vicki Hampton – backing vocals
 Gordon Kennedy – electric guitar
 Jimmy Mattingly – fiddle, acoustic guitar
 Mike Palmer – drums, percussion
 Karyn Rochelle – backing vocals

See also
List of Garth Brooks concert tours

References

Garth Brooks concert tours